Rowland Thomas Lovell Lee (7 March 1920 – 10 October 2005) was a Recorder of the Crown Court (1979–92) and a published poet.

Lee was born on 7 March 1920, the son of Ronald Lovell Lee, and was educated at Bedford Modern School. He served in the Royal Navy (1939–48) and was a prisoner of war (September 1942-March 1943). After World War II he joined the Bedfordshire Constabulary (1948–52) before training to become a solicitor, qualifying in 1957.  He was principal of the practice Wynter Davies & Lee in Hertford (1959–89).

Lee became a Recorder of the Crown Court (1979–92).  He also served as Chairman of the Medical Services Committee, Hertfordshire Family Practitioners Committee (1970–77) and of the North Hertfordshire Health Authority (1977–84).

Poetry
Lee was a published poet: Scarecrow Galabieh, 1998; Small Lazarus, 2000; Each Different Beauty, 2001; Your Face at the Window, 2002; Rocking Horse, 2002; Knock on Any Door, 2003; East Wind.

Family life
In 1944, Lee married Marjorie Betty, daughter of the late William Holmes and Clare Johnston Braid Holmes. They had two daughters. Rowland Lee died on 10 October 2005.

References

1920 births
2005 deaths
People educated at Bedford Modern School
English solicitors
20th-century English judges